Randall Jordan Goforth (born January 27, 1994) is a former American football cornerback. He played college football at UCLA.

College career
As a freshman in 2012, Goforth played in all 14 games and started in five. He finished the year with 39 total tackles. Goforth came into his sophomore year in 2013 as a starter for the Bruins. He established totals in solo and total tackles and was the leader of the secondary, starting in all 13 games. Coming into his junior season, Goforth was seen as a possible NFL draft prospect and was one of the stars on the Bruins defense.

On August 20, 2014 Goforth solidified this when in the season opener at Virginia, he had 5 tackles and returned a fumble 75 yards for a touchdown in a 28–20 win. The next game vs the Memphis Tigers he went down with an injury, ending his season. In Goforth’s redshirt junior season, he was named second team All-Pac-12 defense and in his junior season relied more All-Pac-12 honors.

In his career at UCLA Goforth totaled 250 tackles and 10 interceptions.

Statistics

† Goforth suffered an injury and was granted a redshirt by the NCAA.

Professional career

Philadelphia Eagles
Goforth signed with the Philadelphia Eagles after going undrafted in the 2017 NFL Draft. On July 29, 2017, Goforth tore his ACL in training camp and was placed on injured reserve, keeping him out the entire 2017 season. On August 2, 2017 he was placed on injured reserve. In his lone season with Philadelphia, Goforth went on to win Super Bowl LII with the Eagles against the New England Patriots 41-33.

On July 24, 2018, Goforth was waived by the Eagles.

Arizona Hotshots
In 2018, Goforth signed with the Arizona Hotshots of the Alliance of American Football for the 2019 season. He was waived on March 6, 2019.

Los Angeles Police Department
On June 11, 2021, Goforth announced via Instagram that he had successfully completed training to become a member of the Los Angeles Police Department. He publicly conveyed that his goal with the PD is to inspire change within the community of Los Angeles, as well as promote unity. Despite joining the LAPD, he still remains an NFL Free Agent.

References

External links
 UCLA Bruins bio
 Philadelphia Eagles profile
 Randall Goforth on ESPN.com
 Pro-Football-Reference profile

1994 births
Living people
African-American players of American football
American football cornerbacks
American sportspeople of Samoan descent
Arizona Hotshots players
Philadelphia Eagles players
Players of American football from Long Beach, California
UCLA Bruins football players
21st-century African-American sportspeople